The 2012 IIHF World Women's Championships was the 14th such event hosted by the International Ice Hockey Federation and took place in Vermont, United States, at the Gutterson Fieldhouse in Burlington, and the Cairns Arena in South Burlington. The competition also served as qualifications for the 2013 competition, and the 2014 Olympics. The Top Division was contested between eight teams from April 7 to April 14, 2012, in Burlington and was hosted by USA Hockey.

Canada won their tenth title by defeating the United States 5–4 in overtime. Caroline Ouellette scored the decisive goal. The Americans defeated the Canadians 9–2 in the group stage earlier in the tournament. The Swiss team, by finishing third, captured their first ever Women's World Championship medal.

Top Division 

The Top Division was contested between eight teams from April 7 to April 14, 2012. The event was hosted by USA Hockey in Burlington, Vermont. A new format was used where the top four ranked teams were placed in Group A and were automatically qualified for the final round, and played in the preliminary round was only used to determine seeding for the next round. The top two teams received a bye into the semifinals. Meanwhile, the next four teams played the preliminary round in Group B. The top two teams from Group B joined the others for the final round, while the bottom two team played a best-of-three series, with the loser being relegated next year.

Group A

Group B

 — promoted to Top Division pool for 2012

Rosters

Each team's roster for the 2012 IIHF Women's World Championship consisted of at least 15 skaters (forwards, and defencemen) and 2 goaltenders, and at most 20 skaters and 3 goaltenders. All eight participating nations, through the confirmation of their respective national associations, had to submit a roster by the first IIHF directorate meeting on 6 April 2012.

Preliminary round

Group A

All times are local (UTC−4).

Group B

All times are local (UTC−4).

Relegation series

Best of three.

All times are local (UTC−4).

The third game of the relegation series was cancelled because Germany won both meetings and Slovakia is therefore relegated.

Final round 

All times are local (UTC−4).

Quarterfinals

Semifinals

Fifth place game

Bronze medal game

Gold medal game

Ranking and statistics

Final standings

Scoring leaders
List shows the top 10 skaters sorted by points, then goals.

GP = Games played; G = Goals; A = Assists; Pts = Points; +/− = Plus/minus; PIM = Penalties In MinutesSource: IIHF.COM

Leading goaltenders
Only the top five goaltenders, based on save percentage, who have played 40% of their team's minutes are included in this list.
TOI = Time on ice (minutes:seconds); SA = Shots against; GA = Goals against; GAA = Goals against average; Sv% = Save percentage; SO = ShutoutsSource: IIHF.com

Tournament Awards
Media All-Stars
Goaltender: 
Defense: , 
Best players selected by the directorate:
Best Goaltender: 
Best Defenceman: 
Best Forward:

Division I

Division I A
The Division I A tournament was played in Ventspils, Latvia, from 25 to 31 March 2012.

Division I B
The Division I B tournament was played in Hull, Great Britain, from 9 to 15 April 2012.

Division II

Division II A
The Division II A tournament was played in Maribor, Slovenia, from 25 to 31 March 2012.

Division II B
The Division II B tournament was played in Seoul, South Korea, from 10 to 16 March 2012.

See also 
2012 IIHF World Women's U18 Championship

References

External links 
 International Ice Hockey Federation

 
2012
World
World
International ice hockey competitions hosted by the United States
IIHF Women's Worlds
IIHF Women's World Championship
Ice hockey competitions in Vermont
Women's ice hockey competitions in the United States
Women's sports in Vermont